Viljar Peep (born 9 June 1969 in Tartu) is an Estonian historian and civil servant.

From 2008 to 2018, he was the head of Estonian Data Protection Inspection.

In 2008, he was awarded with Order of the White Star, V class.

References

1969 births
Living people
20th-century Estonian historians
Estonian civil servants
Recipients of the Order of the White Star, 4th Class
University of Tartu alumni
Academic staff of the Tallinn University of Technology
People from Tartu